Ragged Old Flag is the 47th album by American country music singer Johnny Cash, released on Columbia Records in 1974. The album addresses several political as well as ethical issues, like many of Cash's other releases. The title track, and the only single from the album, is a spoken word tribute to patriotism amid the Watergate scandal. "Don't Go Near the Water" addresses another hot political issue of the time, the environment. All of the songs on the album were composed by Cash, save "I'm a Worried Man" by himself and June Carter Cash.

Track listing

Personnel
 Johnny Cash – vocals, producer, liner notes, guitar
 Marshall Grant – bass
 W.S. Holland – drums
 Bob Wootton, Carl Perkins, Ray Edenton – guitar
 Larry McCoy – piano
 Earl Scruggs – banjo on "Ragged Old Flag"
 The Oak Ridge Boys – backing vocals
 Charles Cochran – arranger, orchestration on "Ragged Old Flag"
Technical
 Charlie Bragg – producer, engineer
 Al Quaglieri – producer, reissue producer
 Freeman Ramsey – engineer
 Roger Tucker – chief engineer
 Howard Fritzson – art director, reissue art director
 Billy Barnes – cover design
 Al Clayton – cover photography
 Seth Foster – mastering
 Randall Martin – design
 John Henry Jackson – project director
 Steven Berkowitz – A&R
 Patti Matheny – A&R
 Darren Salmieri – A&R

Charts
Album – Billboard (United States)

Singles – Billboard (United States)

References

Ragged Old Flag
Ragged Old Flag
Ragged Old Flag